Guy Kingsley Poynter, also known as Guy Kingsley (3 September 1915 – 6 September 1983), was an American actor.

Poynter is best remembered for his part as 'Doctor Daniel "Doc" Matthews' in the 1950s radio series Journey into Space. He appeared in the TV drama Armchair Theatre in 1959; as the narrator for Harrison Marks' Naked as Nature Intended in 1961; and played twice in ITV's "Play Of The Week", in 1963. He made many other appearances in various-sized parts, often playing against well-known stars of the period.

Personal life

Poynter and Margaret E Fraser married in 1947.

He died in London in 1983.

Filmography
Too Much Johnson (1938) – Henry MacIntosh 
Cage of Gold (1950) – American soldier (uncredited)
The Good Die Young (1954) – US serviceman at train station (uncredited)
The Crooked Sky (1957) – Tom Alanson
Floods of Fear (1958) – Deputy Sheriff
Beyond the Curtain (1960) – Capt. Law
Peeping Tom (1960) – P. Tate – Studio cameraman (uncredited)
Naked as Nature Intended (1961) – Narrator
 (1962) – Narrator
Heavens Above! (1963) – American commentator (uncredited)
The Girl Hunters (1963) – Dr Larry Snyder

TV Work

Notes

References

1915 births
1983 deaths
American actors